was a samurai retainer to the Takeda clan during Japan's Sengoku period. Fighting for the Takeda at the battle of Nagashino, he was moved by the bravery of Torii Suneemon, a common foot-soldier of the  opposing forces who risked his life, escaping from the besieged castle to seek reinforcements from Tokugawa Ieyasu, only to be captured and crucified by the Takeda; from then on, Ochiai used an image of Torii Suneemon on the cross as his standard.

References
Turnbull, Stephen (1998). 'The Samurai Sourcebook'. London: Cassell & Co.

Samurai